HNHS may refer to:
 Havelock North High School, Havelock North, New Zealand
 Holy Name High School, Parma Heights, Ohio, United States
 Holy Name High School (Reading, Pennsylvania), United States
 Holy Names High School (Oakland, California), United States
 Holy Names High School (Windsor, Ontario), Canada
 Huntington North High School, Huntington County, Indiana, United States